Zander Mateo Cassierra Cabezas (born 13 April 1997) is a Colombian professional footballer who plays as a forward for Russian club Zenit St. Petersburg.

Career

Deportivo Cali
Cassierra made his debut for Deportivo Cali in 2015. Despite having played at Deportivo Cali with a jersey displaying "Casierra", his official name is spelled "Cassierra" (with two s's).

Ajax
On 17 June 2016, Cassierra signed a five-year contract with Dutch club Ajax, lasting until 2021. The club paid Deportivo Cali  €5.5 million to complete the transfer. Cassierra is the third Colombian player to play for Ajax after Daniel Cruz (2000–2003) and Davinson Sánchez. He scored a goal in his Eredivisie debut against Sparta Rotterdam in a 1–3 win.

Cassierra spent the majority of the 2017–18 season playing for the reserves' team Jong Ajax, in the Eerste Divisie. He finished as top scorer of the reserves team with 18 goals scored, helping his side to clinch their first championship since joining the professional ranks and competing in the second tier of Dutch football.

Groningen loan
On 2 June 2018, Ajax announced its loan, for one season, to FC Groningen. However, he returned after only half a season.

Racing loan
In January 2019, he joined Racing on loan until July 2020.

Sochi
On 26 August 2021, he signed a two-year contract with an additional one-year option with Russian Premier League club PFC Sochi. Cassierra finished 2021–22 Russian Premier League as the second-best goal scorer with 14 goals, behind Gamid Agalarov who scored 19, as Sochi finished in 2nd place, club's historical best position.

Zenit St. Petersburg
On 30 June 2022, Zenit St. Petersburg announced the signing of Cassierra to a three-year contract, with the option of an additional year.

Career statistics

Club

Honours

Club
Ajax
 UEFA Europa League: runners-up 2016-17

Jong Ajax
 Eerste Divisie: Champion 2017-18

Racing Club
 Primera División: Champion 2018–19

Zenit Saint Petersburg
 Russian Super Cup: 2022

References

External links
 

1997 births
Living people
People from Barbacoas, Nariño
Association football forwards
Colombian footballers
Colombian expatriate footballers
Categoría Primera A players
Eredivisie players
Eerste Divisie players
Primeira Liga players
Russian Premier League players
Deportivo Cali footballers
AFC Ajax players
Jong Ajax players
FC Groningen players
Racing Club de Avellaneda footballers
Belenenses SAD players
PFC Sochi players
FC Zenit Saint Petersburg players
Colombian expatriate sportspeople in Argentina
Colombian expatriate sportspeople in the Netherlands
Colombian expatriate sportspeople in Portugal
Colombian expatriate sportspeople in Russia
Expatriate footballers in Argentina
Expatriate footballers in the Netherlands
Expatriate footballers in Portugal
Expatriate footballers in Russia
Sportspeople from Nariño Department